Gregory Alan Hancock (born June 3, 1970 in Whittier, California) is an American former professional motorcycle speedway rider. As of 2023, he was one of only six riders to have won the individual World Championship four or more times.

In addition to his four Speedway World Championships he won the Speedway World Team Cup with the USA speedway team on three occasions. Hancock appeared in all but one of the Grand Prix series, since its creation in 1995 until 2019.

Career
Hancock first came to the United Kingdom at the end of the 1988 speedway season to ride exhibition races with fellow 18-year-old Californian Billy Hamill. It was during this time that Hancock agreed a deal to ride for Cradley Heath the following year – the same team that his mentor Bruce Penhall used to ride for. Hancock was an instant success for Cradley in the British League. He also won gold medals for the US in the 1992 World Pairs and World Team Cup. However, due to injury and problems with the American Motorcyclist Association, Hancock was not able to compete in the Individual World Championship until 1993. That year he went through to the World Final in Germany where he finished last. In 1994, Hancock again qualified for the last 'one off' World Final. He went into his last race needing a victory to become world champion but he finished third in the race and fourth overall on the night.

He rode for the Swedish team Rospiggarna for 15 years from 1995 to 2009. He also continued to ride in Great Britain and Poland domestically.

In 1995, Hancock finished in 4th place in the first year of the Grand Prix (GP). He won the final round, the British GP at the Hackney Wick Stadium. The following year he joined with fellow American and Cradley teammate Billy Hamill to form Team Exide. With this newfound sponsorship, the two young Californians began to dominate world speedway. In 1996 Hamill won the world title and Hancock finished with the bronze medal in third place. In 1997 Hancock moved from Cradley Heath (due to the club's closure) to the Coventry Bees. He won the first GP of the year in Prague and continued the season in the same form. He won the world title (with Hamill finishing second for a Team Exide one-two) and won the Elite League Riders' Championship.

In 1998 to Grand Prix format changed to a more cutthroat elimination system. Hancock did not fare so well and finished the year in sixth place but won the World Team Cup with Hamill and Sam Ermolenko. The next year was even worse for Hancock and he finished in 11th place in the Grand Prix. 2000 saw Hancock win his first Grand Prix since his title winning season and he finished in fifth place and in 2001 he finished in 13th place. In 2002 Hancock won the last Grand Prix round in Australia and finished 6th overall. He went one better in 2003, finishing in 5th place after again winning the final round, this time in Haamar, Norway. The following season Hancock was back amongst the medals, finishing the season in third place. That year he won the British GP at the Millennium Stadium in Cardiff. In 2005 Hancock slipped back to fifth in the world unable to win a GP. A 36-year-old Hancock finished the Grand Prix series in second place in 2006 and remained unbeaten in that year's World Cup but the USA did not qualify for the final as the rest of the team struggled. In 2007 Hancock finished in sixth place. Although he failed to win a GP, he finished in second place on three occasions. In 2008 Hancock finished fourth overall in the Grand Prix series. He was on the podium four times, winning the Polish Grand Prix in Bydgoszcz.

Hancock finished the 2009 Speedway Grand Prix season in fourth position and achieved two podium places as runner up at the Danish Grand Prix and winner of the Latvian Grand Prix. He became the USA Speedway National Champion for the eighth time in 2009 and was subsequently named as the Racing Athlete of the Year by the American Motorcyclist Association (AMA).

Greg finished 1st place in the 2011 Czech, British and Nordic Grand Prix. He secured the 2011 World Championship during the Croatian Grand Prix on 24 September, reclaiming the title after a record 14 years at the age of 41 years and 113 days.  Hancock clinched the 2014 World Championship during the Polish Grand Prix on October 11, 2014, and broke his own record of oldest title winner at 44 years and 130 days.

After having competed in every Speedway Grand Prix event since its inception in 1995, Greg Hancock missed his first SGP round in 2014 when he was forced to sit out the Nordic Grand Prix at Vojens with injury after his crash with Niels Kristian Iversen two weeks earlier.

Hancock had a slow start to the 2015 Speedway Grand Prix season in defense of his title, only scoring 14 points in the first two rounds and not gaining a podium finish until his second place in Poland II at the Edward Jancarz Stadium in Gorzów for Round 8. He then won the Slovenian GP in Krško in Round 9, finished second in Round 10 in the Scandinavian GP in Sweden, before finishing off the year in style by scoring an unbeaten 21 point maximum in the Grand Prix of Australia at the Etihad Stadium in Melbourne to secure second place in the championship, 16 points behind England's Tai Woffinden and 14 points clear of third placed Nicki Pedersen.

He regained his speedway world title in 2016 as he consistently piled up the points, including victory in the Swedish Speedway Grand Prix in Malilla in July. He wrapped up the championship after his first ride in the final Grand Prix of the season in Melbourne, Australia.

Despite only competing in six events in 2017, he finished in fourteenth place with 45 points.

After a one-year hiatus due to his wife suffering from breast cancer Hancock signed for clubs in Poland and Sweden and was given a 'permanent wild card' into the 2020 Grand Prix Series but after talking about his return with Hancock his son Wilbur said it would be difficult for Greg to return to speedway at the level he was racing when he took his break. As a result, Hancock decided to retire in early 2020. In a statement on February 14 he told the world that "As difficult as it is to make a decision like this, it is the right one.".

Awards
In 2020, Hancock was named an FIM Legend. He was also elected into the Motorcycle Hall of Fame on 28 October 2022.

Personal
Hancock lives in Costa Mesa, California. During the European speedway season he is based in Hallstavik, Sweden with his wife Jennie and three sons Wilbur, Bill, and Karl.

World final appearances

Individual World Championship
 1993 -  Pocking, Rottalstadion - 16th - 2pts
 1994 -  Vojens, Speedway Center - 4th - 11pts

World Pairs Championship
 1992 -  Lonigo, Pista Speedway (with Sam Ermolenko / Ronnie Correy) - Winner - 23+3pts (11+3)
 1993 -  Vojens, Speedway Center (with Sam Ermolenko / Ronnie Correy) - 2nd - 23pts (0)

World Team Cup
 1989 -  Bradford, Odsal Stadium (with Kelly Moran / Ronnie Correy / Rick Miller / Lance King) - 4th - 8pts (2)
 1991 -  Vojens, Speedway Center - 3rd - 28pts (6)
 1992 -  Kumla, Kumla Speedway - Winner - 39pts (11)
 1993 -  Coventry, Brandon Stadium - Winner - 40pts (9)
 1994 -  Brokstedt, Holsteinring Brokstedt - 5th - 17+1pts (5)
 1995 -  Bydgoszcz, Polonia Bydgoszcz Stadium - 3rd - 19+3pts (8)
 1998 -  Vojens, Speedway Center - Winner - 28pts (12)
 1999 -  Pardubice, Svítkova Stadion - 3rd - 29+3pts (6)
 2000 -  Coventry, Brandon Stadium - 3rd - 35pts (16)

World Cup
 2001 -  Wrocław, Olympic Stadium - 5th - 30pts (9)

Speedway Grand Prix results

See also
 United States national speedway team
 List of Speedway Grand Prix riders

References

1970 births
Living people
American speedway riders
Individual Speedway World Champions
Speedway World Pairs Champions
Coventry Bees riders
Oxford Cheetahs riders
Reading Racers riders
Cradley Heathens riders
Sportspeople from Whittier, California